Grigory Anatolyevich Drozd (born 26 August 26, 1979) is a Russian former professional boxer. He is the former WBC cruiserweight champion, having lost the title when he was unable to defend it due to injury and was subsequently stripped. He also is a former European cruiserweight champion.

Boxing career
Drozd only fought three amateur fights, winning all of them. His manager is Dietmar Poszwa.

Drozd vs. Wilson 
Drozd faced Darnell Wilson on July 2, 2009 at the Krylatskoye Sports Palace in Moscow, winning the fight in the tenth round.

Drozd vs. Simms 
He fought Michael Simms on February 23, 2008, at the DIVS in Ekaterinburg with an attendance of 25,000 at the stadium. The fight went eight rounds and Drozd won the fight via unanimous decision.

Drozd vs. Calloway 
On 6 December 2008, Drozd Fought Rob Calloway for the vacant WBO Asia Pacific Cruiserweight title, vacant WBC Asian Boxing Council Cruiserweight title and the vacant PABA Cruiserweight title at the circus in Nizhny Novgorod. It was voted Asian Super Fight of the year, with Drozd winning by seventh-round technical knockout.

Drozd vs. Masternak 
On October 5, 2013, Drozd won the EBU (European) Cruiserweight title in Moscow by defeating Mateusz Masternak via eleventh-round technical knockout.

Drozd vs. Quanna 
Drozd retained the title against mandatory challenger Jeremy Ouanna on March 15, 2014.

Drozd vs. Wlodarczyk 
In his next bout, Drozd won his first world title by defeating Krzysztof Włodarczyk on September 27, 2014, to win the WBC Cruiserweight title. Drozd won the fight convincingly, with the judges scoring it 119-108, 119-108 and 118-109 in favor of Drozd.

Drozd vs. Janik 
In his next bout, Drozd fought Lukasz Janik, which was his first title defence. Drozd beat Lukasz Janik by technical knockout in the 9th round.

Drozd lost the WBC cruiserweight title at the end of May 2016 when he was unable to defend it due to injury, and Tony Bellew defeated Ilunga Makabu in three rounds to win it. Instead he was made interim champion, but was removed from that position due to inactivity in December 2016. He has not fought since.

Professional boxing record

|-
| style="text-align:center;" colspan="8"|40 Wins (28 knockouts, 12 decisions), 1 Loss (1 knockout)
|-  style="text-align:center; background:#e3e3e3;"
|  style="border-style:none none solid solid; "|Result
|  style="border-style:none none solid solid; "|Record
|  style="border-style:none none solid solid; "|Opponent
|  style="border-style:none none solid solid; "|Type
|  style="border-style:none none solid solid; "|Rd., Time
|  style="border-style:none none solid solid; "|Date
|  style="border-style:none none solid solid; "|Location
|  style="border-style:none none solid solid; "|Notes
|- align=center
|Win
|40–1
|align=left| Łukasz Janik
|
|
|
|align=left|
|align=left|
|- align=center
|Win
|39–1
|align=left| Krzysztof Włodarczyk
|
|
|
|align=left|
|align=left|
|- align=center
|Win
|38–1
|align=left| Jeremy Ouanna
|
|
|
|align=left|
|align=left|
|- align=center
|Win
|37–1
|align=left| Mateusz Masternak
|
|
|
|align=left|
|align=left|
|- align=center
|Win
|36–1
|align=left| Jean Marc Monrose
|
|
|
|align=left|
|align=left|
|- align=center
|Win
|35–1
|align=left| Fabio Garrido
|
|
|
|align=left|
|align=left|
|- align=center
|Win
|34–1
|align=left| Richard Hall
|
|
|
|align=left|
|align=left|
|- align=center
|Win
|33–1
|align=left| Remigijus Ziausys
|
|
|
|align=left|
|align=left|
|- align=center
|Win
|32–1
|align=left| Darnell Wilson
|
|
|
|align=left|
|align=left|
|- align=center
|Win
|31–1
|align=left| Rob Calloway
|
|
|
|align=left|
|align=left|
|- align=center
|Win
|30–1
|align=left| Talgat Dosanov
|
|
|
|align=left|
|align=left|
|- align=center
|Win
|29–1
|align=left| Michael Simms
|
|
|
|align=left|
|align=left|
|- align=center
|Win
|28–1
|align=left| Laudelino Barros
|
|
|
|align=left|
|align=left|
|- align=center
|Win
|27–1
|align=left| Jean Claude Bikoi
|
|
|
|align=left|
|align=left|
|- align=center
|Win
|26–1
|align=left| Mircea Telecan
|
|
|
|align=left|
|align=left|
|- align=center
|Loss
|25–1
|align=left| Firat Arslan
|
|
|
|align=left|
|align=left|
|- align=center
|Win
|25–0
|align=left| Mauro Adrian Ordiales
|
|
|
|align=left|
|align=left|
|- align=center
|Win
|24–0
|align=left| Pavel Melkomyan
|
|
|
|align=left|
|align=left|
|- align=center
|Win
|23–0
|align=left| Shane Swartz
|
|
|
|align=left|
|align=left|
|- align=center
|Win
|22–0
|align=left| Asmir Vojnovic
|
|
|
|align=left|
|align=left|
|- align=center
|Win
|21–0
|align=left| Denis Salomka
|
|
|
|align=left|
|align=left|
|- align=center
|Win
|20–0
|align=left| Jason Robinson
|
|
|
|align=left|
|align=left|
|- align=center
|Win
|19–0
|align=left| Saul Montana
|
|
|
|align=left|
|align=left|
|- align=center
|Win
|18–0
|align=left| Muslim Biarslanov
|
|
|
|align=left|
|align=left|
|- align=center
|Win
|17–0
|align=left| Yan Kulkov
|
|
|
|align=left|
|align=left|
|- align=center
|Win
|16–0
|align=left| Oleksandr Garashchenko
|
|
|
|align=left|
|align=left|
|- align=center
|Win
|15–0
|align=left| Oleksandr Subin
|
|
|
|align=left|
|align=left|
|- align=center
|Win
|14–0
|align=left| Akmal Aslanov
|
|
|
|align=left|
|align=left|
|- align=center
|Win
|13–0
|align=left| Pavel Kalabin
|
|
|
|align=left|
|align=left|
|- align=center
|Win
|12–0
|align=left| Ihor Pylypenko
|
|
|
|align=left|
|align=left|
|- align=center
|Win
|11–0
|align=left| Teymuraz Kekelidze
|
|
|
|align=left|
|align=left|
|- align=center
|Win
|10–0
|align=left| Sedrak Agagulyan
|
|
|
|align=left|
|align=left|
|- align=center
|Win
|9–0
|align=left| Mikhail Balovnev
|
|
|
|align=left|
|align=left|
|- align=center
|Win
|8–0
|align=left| Siarhei Krupenich
|
|
|
|align=left|
|align=left|
|- align=center
|Win
|7–0
|align=left| Dmitry Gerasimov
|
|
|
|align=left|
|align=left|
|- align=center
|Win
|6–0
|align=left| Yuriy Bylynchuk
|
|
|
|align=left|
|align=left|
|- align=center
|Win
|5–0
|align=left| Evgeny Galchenko
|
|
|
|align=left|
|align=left|
|- align=center
|Win
|4–0
|align=left| Valery Makeev
|
|
|
|align=left|
|align=left|
|- align=center
|Win
|3–0
|align=left| Cesar Ramos
|
|
|
|align=left|
|align=left|
|- align=center
|Win
|2–0
|align=left| Timofey Maklakov
|
|
|
|align=left|
|align=left|
|- align=center
|Win
|1–0
|align=left| Valeri Semiskur
|
|
|
|align=left|
|align=left|
|}

References

External links

Grigory Drozd - Profile, News Archive & Current Rankings at Box.Live

|-

 

1979 births
Living people
People from Prokopyevsk
Russian male boxers
Cruiserweight boxers
Sportspeople from Kemerovo Oblast
European Boxing Union champions